Carnival Sunshine (formerly Carnival Destiny) is a cruise ship operated by Carnival Cruise Line. She debuted in 1996 as the first passenger ship ever built to exceed 100,000 gross tons, and became the first to break the record the Queen Elizabeth set in 1940 as the world's largest passenger vessel, holding it until 1998. Built by Fincantieri at its Monfalcone shipyard in Friuli-Venezia Giulia, northern Italy, she was christened as Carnival Destiny in Venice, Italy, in November 1996 by Lin Arison, the wife of Carnival Cruise Line founder Ted Arison. In the 1997 American comedy-drama film Holy Man featuring Eddie Murphy, Jeff Goldblum and Kelly Preston, Carnival Destiny is seen in the background several times at the beginning of the movie, the first time the main characters meet.

In 2013, she received a major refit and a rename, with sister ships Carnival Sunrise and Carnival Radiance following suit in 2019 and 2021 respectively. At a ceremony in New Orleans on 17 November 2013, she was formally renamed, with Lin Arison once again serving as her godmother.

Since May 2019 the ship has been homeported in Charleston, South Carolina. It was originally planned to sail to Cuba from Charleston but those plans were cancelled after the Cuban travel ban in 2019.

History

Carnival Destiny went into dry dock in Trieste, Italy in 2013 to be refitted and renamed Carnival Sunshine. The refitting, which was completed in May 2013, was delayed by a month to install new back-up generator systems.

In late 2021, Carnival Sunshine was repainted into Carnival's new livery.

Layout

Following a multimillion-dollar refurbishment in 2005, Carnival Destiny featured three pools, a variety of dining options, lounges, nightclubs, a casino and a spa. Carnival Destiny received more modifications in 2010, including a movie screen on the Lido deck and cabin renovations.

On 6 March 2012, Carnival announced that Destiny would undergo a US$155-million dollar refit, and renaming of the ship as Carnival Sunshine. The ship was re-launched on 5 May 2013. The refit included a racing themed waterpark with one of the biggest slides in Carnival's fleet.

Areas of operation

Other than an 18-day cruise across the Atlantic to position her for the refit in Italy, the ship has always operated from ports in the United States cruising primarily to Caribbean destinations. The Carnival Sunshine is primarily doing three to five night voyages from Charleston that visit Nassau, Freeport, Half Moon Cay, and Princess Cays. The ship also participated in the fun ship meet up in March 2022 to commemorate Carnival's 50th anniversary. It will also do various ten day voyages that visit St. Thomas, St. Martin, Antigua, St. Kitts, San Juan, Princess Cays, Grand Turk, Aruba, and Bonaire.

References

Notes

Bibliography

External links 

 
Carnival Sunshine Photo Gallery
Photos of the disco from 1997

1995 ships
Sunshine
Ships built in Monfalcone
Ships built by Fincantieri